Shandonagh, also Shanonagh, is a village in County Westmeath, Ireland. It is located on the R392 road, to the west of Mullingar.

The Royal Canal flows through the town, with the Shandonagh bridge being used to cross to the western side.

The village also has a local GAA team.

See also 

 List of towns and villages in Ireland

References 

Towns and villages in County Westmeath